Richard Percy Jones (February 25, 1927 – July 7, 2014), known as Dick Jones or Dickie Jones, was an American actor and singer who achieved success as a child performer and as a young adult, especially in B-Westerns. In 1938, he played Artimer "Artie" Peters, nephew of Buck Peters, in the Hopalong Cassidy film The Frontiersman.  He may be best known as the voice of Pinocchio in Walt Disney's film of the same name.

Early life
Jones was born on February 25, 1927, in Snyder, some ninety miles south of Lubbock, Texas. The son of a newspaper editor, Jones was a prodigious horseman from infancy, having been billed at the age of four as the "World's Youngest Trick Rider and Trick Roper". At the age of six, he was hired to perform riding and lariat tricks in the rodeo owned by western star Hoot Gibson, who convinced young Jones and his parents that he should come to Hollywood. Jones and his mother moved there, and Gibson arranged for some small parts for the boy, whose good looks, energy, and pleasant voice quickly landed him more and bigger parts, both in low-budget westerns as well as in more substantial productions.

Career
Among his early films are Little Men (1934) and A Man to Remember (1938). Jones appeared as a bit player in several of Hal Roach's Our Gang (The Little Rascals) shorts, including The Pigskin Palooka and Our Gang Follies of 1938 (both from 1937). In 1939, Jones appeared as a troublesome kid, Killer Parkins, in the film Nancy Drew... Reporter. The same year he appeared with Jimmy Stewart in Mr. Smith Goes to Washington as Senate page Richard (Dick) Jones. In 1940, he had one of his most prominent (though invisible) roles, as the voice of Pinocchio in Disney's animated film of the same name. Jones attended Hollywood High School and at fifteen took over the role of Henry Aldrich on the hit radio show The Aldrich Family. He learned carpentry and augmented his income with jobs in that field. He served in the Army in the Alaska Territory during the final months of World War II.

Gene Autry, who before the war had cast Jones in several westerns, put him back to work through Autry's Flying A Pictures and, for television, his Flying A Productions. Jones guest-starred regularly on The Gene Autry Show in the early 1950s.

He appeared in a 1950 episode of the TV series The Lone Ranger titled "Man Without a Gun". In 1950, at the age of twenty-three, he played the 16-year-old cook for a small Confederate Army unit in the film Rocky Mountain.

By 1951, he was billed as Dick Jones, and starred as Dick West, sidekick to the Western hero known as The Range Rider, played by Jock Mahoney, in a Gene Autry television series that ran for seventy-six episodes in syndication, beginning in 1951.

Jones was cast thereafter in 1954 and 1955 in four episodes of Annie Oakley, another Flying A Production. Autry gave Jones his own series, Buffalo Bill, Jr. (1955), which ran for forty-two episodes in syndication.

Through his work in Western films and television series from the 1930s through the 1950s, Jones became a fixture at the former Iverson Movie Ranch, considered the most heavily filmed outdoor shooting location in Hollywood history. In 1957, Jones appeared twice as Ned in the episodes "The Brothers" and "Renegade Rangers" of the syndicated American Civil War series Gray Ghost.

In 1960, Jones guest-starred as Bliss in the episode "Fire Flight" of another syndicated series, The Blue Angels, about the elite air-show squadron of the United States Navy. He also appeared in the syndicated western series, Pony Express. In 1962, Jones portrayed John Hunter in the episode "The Wagon Train Mutiny" of NBC's Western series Wagon Train. That same year, he appeared in the television short The Night Rider.

Jones's last acting role was as Cliff Fletcher in the 1965 film Requiem for a Gunfighter.

Honors
In 2000, Dick Jones was named one of the Disney Legends. In early 2009, Jones performed promotional events for the Platinum Edition DVD and Blu-ray release of Pinocchio. In March 2009, he was a guest star at the Williamsburg Film Festival.

Personal life
Jones married his wife Betty in 1948, together they had four children; Rick, Jeffrey, Jennifer and Melody. They remained married until Jones' death in 2014.

Death
The last surviving cast member of Pinocchio, Jones died after a fall at his home on the evening of July 7, 2014, at the age of 87.

Filmography 

 Wonder Bar (1934) as Boy (uncredited)
 Burn 'Em Up Barnes (1934) as Schoolboy [Chs. 1, 7] (uncredited)
 Babes in Toyland (1934) as Schoolboy (uncredited)
 Kid Millions (1934) as Little Boy in Ice Cream Number (uncredited)
 Strange Wives (1934) as Twin
 Little Men (1934) as Dolly
 Life Returns (1935) as Newsboy (uncredited)
 The Pecos Kid (1935) as Donald Pecos – as a Boy (uncredited)
 The Call of the Savage (1935, Serial) as Jan Trevor as a Boy [Ch. 1]
 The Hawk (1935) as Dickie Thomas
 Queen of the Jungle (1935) as David Worth Jr. as a child
 Silk Hat Kid (1935) as Jimmy (uncredited)
 Westward Ho (1935) as Jim Wyatt – as a Child
 O'Shaughnessy's Boy (1935) as Boy with Sling Shot at Parade (uncredited)
 Moonlight on the Prairie (1935) as Dickie Roberts
 Queen of the Jungle (1935) as David Worth as a child
 The Adventures of Frank Merriwell (1936) as Jimmy McLaw (uncredited)
 Exclusive Story (1936) as Higgins' Son (uncredited)
 Sutter's Gold (1936) as 2nd Newsboy (uncredited)
 Little Lord Fauntleroy (1936) as Ceddie at Age 7 (uncredited)
 The First Baby (1936) as Ellis Child (uncredited)
 36 Hours to Kill (1936) as Little Boy Selling The Garden Beautiful (uncredited)
 Pepper (1936) as Member of Pepper's Gang (uncredited)
 Love Begins at 20 (1936) as Boy on Streetcar (uncredited)
 Daniel Boone (1936) as Master Jerry Randolph
 The Man I Marry (1936) as Little Boy (uncredited)
 Wild Horse Round-Up (1936) as Dickie Williams
 Black Legion (1937) as Buddy Taylor
 Blake of Scotland Yard (1937) as Bobby Mason
 Ready, Willing, and Able (1937) as Junior (uncredited)
 Land Beyond the Law (1937) as Bobby Skinner (uncredited)
 Smoke Tree Range (1937) as Teddy Page
 Flying Fists (1937) as Dickie Martin
 Stella Dallas (1937) as Lee Morrison
 Renfrew of the Royal Mounted (1937) as Tommy MacDonald
 Love Is on the Air (1937) as Bill – Mouse's Friend
 Hollywood Round-Up (1937) as Dickie Stevens
 The Kid Comes Back (1938) as Bobby Doyle
 Border Wolves (1938) as Jimmie Benton
 Land of Fighting Men (1938) as Jimmy Mitchell
 Love, Honor and Behave (1938) as Boy Playing with Young Ted (uncredited)
 The Devil's Party (1938) as Joe O'Mara as a Child (uncredited)
 The Great Adventures of Wild Bill Hickok (1938) as Buddy
 A Man to Remember (1938) as Dick Abbott – Age 8–12
 Girls on Probation (1938) as Magazine Newsboy – Witness (uncredited)
 The Frontiersmen (1938) as Artie Peters
 Woman Doctor (1939) as Johnny
 Nancy Drew... Reporter (1939) as Killer Parkins
 Sergeant Madden (1939) as Dennis Madden, as a boy
 The Man Who Dared (1939) as Bill Carter
 Young Mr. Lincoln (1939) as Adam Clay as a Boy (uncredited)
 On Borrowed Time (1939) as Boy in Tree (uncredited)
 Sky Patrol (1939) as Bobby Landis
 Mr. Smith Goes to Washington (1939) as Richard "Dickie" Jones, Senate Page Boy (uncredited)
 Beware Spooks! (1939) as First Boy (uncredited)
 Destry Rides Again (1939) as Claggett Boy
 Pinocchio (1940) as Pinocchio / Alexander (voice, uncredited)
 Virginia City (1940) as Cobby Gill
 Hi-Yo Silver (1940) as The Boy (uncredited)
 Maryland (1940) as Lee Danfield – Age 12 (uncredited)
 Brigham Young (1940) as Henry Kent
 The Howards of Virginia (1940) as Matt Howard at 12
 Knute Rockne All American (1940) as Boy Captain (uncredited)
 Adventure in Washington (1941) as Abbott
 The Vanishing Virginian (1942) as Robert Yancey Jr.
 Mountain Rhythm (1943) as Darwood Gates Alton
 The Outlaw (1943) as Boy (uncredited)
 The Adventures of Mark Twain (1944) as Samuel Clemens – age 15 (uncredited)
 The Strawberry Roan (1948) as Joe Bailey
 Angel on the Amazon (1948) as George (uncredited)
 Battleground (1949) as Tanker (uncredited)
 Sands of Iwo Jima (1949) as Scared Marine (uncredited)
 Sons of New Mexico (1949) as Randy Pryor
 Military Academy with That Tenth Avenue Gang (1950) as Richard Reilly (uncredited)
 The Lone Ranger (1949–1950, TV Series) as Jim Douglas / Jim
 Redwood Forest Trail (1950) as Mighty Mite
 Rocky Mountain (1950) as Jim (Buck) Wheat (CSA)
 Fort Worth (1951) as Luther Wicks
 The Range Rider (1951–1953) as Dick West
 The Old West (1952) as Pinto
 Wagon Team (1952) as Dave Weldon, aka The Apache Kid
 Last of the Pony Riders (1953) as Johnny Blair
 Attila (1954)
 The Bamboo Prison (1954) as P.O.W. Jackie
 The Bridges at Toko-Ri (1954) as Pilot (uncredited)
 The Wild Dakotas (1956) as Mike McGeehee
 The Cool and the Crazy (1958) as Stu Summerville
 Shadow of the Boomerang (1960) as Bob Prince
 The Devil's Bedroom (1964) as Norm
 Requiem for a Gunfighter (1965) as Cliff Fletcher (final film role)

References

Further reading
 Dye, David. Child and Youth Actors: Filmography of Their Entire Careers, 1914–1985. Jefferson, NC: McFarland & Co., 1988, pp. 118–119.
 Holmstrom, John. The Moving Picture Boy: An International Encyclopaedia from 1895 to 1995, Norwich, Michael Russell, 1996, pp. 149–150.

External links

 
 Dick Jones at the Disney Legends Website
 Dick Jones at the Iverson Movie Ranch

1927 births
2014 deaths
People from Snyder, Texas
Male actors from Los Angeles
American male film actors
American male child actors
American male radio actors
American male voice actors
American male television actors
Male actors from Texas
20th-century American male actors
United States Army soldiers
United States Army personnel of World War II
United States Army personnel of the Korean War
Accidental deaths from falls